How We Fought the Emden is a 1915 Australian silent film directed by Alfred Rolfe about the Battle of Cocos during World War I. It features footage shot on Cocos Island.

Plot
He takes part in the Battle of Cocos, where the Australian cruiser destroys the German light cruiser .

Cast
Charles Villiers

Production
The film incorporates footage from the documentary How We Fought the Emden.

It was shot at the Rushcutters Bay studio.

Release
The film was popular at the box office. Actor C. Post Mason took a print with him to Canada in 1916 and screened the film over there. It was also known as How We Fought the Emden andy The Sydney-Emden Fight.

The Motion Picture News said the film was put on "principally with the idea of drawing patrons from" For Australia and was "merely a succession of interest and topical subjects woven together, and a plot that does not reflect much credit on either the author or producers".

The movie was later combined with another Australian war film, For Australia (1915) to create a new movie, For the Honour of Australia (1916).

See also
The Exploits of the Emden, a 1928 film by Ken G. Hall, also about the Battle of Cocos

References

External links
 
Clip from film at Australian Screen Online
How We Beat the Emden at National Film and Sound Archive
How We Beat the Emden at AustLit

1915 films
1915 war films
Australian black-and-white films
Australian silent films
Australian World War I films
Films directed by Alfred Rolfe
World War I naval films
World War I films based on actual events
Silent war films
1910s English-language films